Heysel (French) or Heizel (Dutch) is a Brussels Metro station on line 6. It is located in Laeken, in the north-west of the City of Brussels, Belgium, and serves the Heysel/Heizel Plateau, famous for the World's Fairs of 1935 and 1958, the King Baudouin Stadium (formerly known as the Heysel Stadium) and the Atomium. The Bruparck entertainment park (with among others Mini-Europe miniature park and Kinepolis Brussels cinema) and the Centenary Palace, home to the Brussels Exhibition Centre (Brussels Expo), are also located nearby.

The station opened on 5 July 1985. Prior to 1998, it was the western terminus of former line 1A (now line 6). The line was expanded to the King Baudouin metro station for the 2000 UEFA European Football Championship. It offers a connection with tram route 7 as well as bus routes 84 and 88.

References

External links

Brussels metro stations
Railway stations opened in 1985
City of Brussels
1985 establishments in Belgium